Hari Shankar and Harish Narayan are an Indian director and writer duo predominantly working in Tamil film industry. Hari and Harish are pioneers as filmmakers of three consecutive first-of-its-kind movies in Tamil, namely Orr Eravuu (2010), India's First Viewpoint film, Ambuli (2012), first Stereoscopic 3D Tamil film and Aaaah (2014), first horror anthology Tamil film.

In 2022, Hari and Harish made their Telugu cinema directorial debut with Yashoda, starring Samantha Ruth Prabhu.

Filmography

Filmography

Awards

References

External links

Indian film directors
Indian screenwriters
Indian filmmaking duos
1978 births
1983 births
Living people